Charles Jeffrey Schwertner (born May 29, 1970) is an American  orthopedic surgeon and politician from Georgetown, Texas. He has served in the Texas State Senate since November 6, 2012, after having represented House District 20 in the Texas House of Representatives for a single term beginning in January 2011. He is a Republican.

As a member of the Texas Senate, Schwertner serves as chairman of the Senate Committee on Business and Commerce. He is currently a member of the Senate Committees on Education, Finance, State Affairs, and the HHS Transition Legislative Oversight Committee. Schwertner also chairs the Sunset Advisory Commission, a 12-member body of legislators and public members that periodically reviews function and operations of more than 130 state agencies.

Schwertner was named one of the "Worst Legislators" in Texas  by Texas Monthly magazine in 2015 and 2017 calling him “mean-spirited and insecure” and citing an incident where he "silenced an abortion rights witness by slamming his gavel down so hard that it broke the glass tabletop of his desk."

Efforts to reform the Texas electric grid 
In 2021, Senator Schwertner passed SB 3 to substantively reform the Texas power grid in the aftermath of a series of major winter storms that left many Texans without power for several days. These changes included requiring the weatherization of critical power generation, natural gas, and electrical transmission infrastructure; instituting an emergency alert system to notify Texans about extended power outages; and reforming the electric market to increase generation capacity and improve the reliability of the state’s power grid.

Importantly, SB 3 also formalized the Texas Electric Reliability Council to “enhance coordination and communication in the energy and electric industries in this state.” As part of its duties, the Council is tasked with overseeing the Texas Electricity Supply Chain Security and Mapping Committee. The Committee is directed to develop and update a Texas-wide power supply chain map for use during a disaster and to enhance emergency preparedness and response.

Recognizing the need for more accountability and oversight at the Public Utilities Commission, Schwertner also passed SB 2154, which expanded the number of commissioners from three to five and added new eligibility requirements for commissioners.

Expanding gun-owner rights 
In 2021, Senator Schwertner sponsored HB 1927, also known as the "constitutional carry" law. The law  allows anyone who can legally own a firearm to carry it – in a holster – in public, for the first time since Reconstruction. HB 1927 doesn't change eligibility for gun ownership; the law still requires that an individual be at least 21 years old and can not have served a sentence for a felony or family violence within the last five years. The law also adds some other misdemeanors to the list for those who want to carry, including assault causing bodily injury, deadly conduct, terroristic threat, and disorderly conduct with a firearm. Texas is now the 20th state to pass a "constitutional carry" law.

Schwertner also passed SB 19 to prohibit corporations that discriminate against the firearms industry from obtaining contracts with Texas governmental entities. According to Schwertner, this bill was authored in response to reports that banks were refusing to grant loans to businesses in the firearms industry.

Allegations of lewd texting
On October 8, 2018, the University of Texas at Austin hired Johnny Sutton, a former federal prosecutor, to investigate claims that Schwertner sent sexually-explicit text messages to a female graduate student and whether such harassment could be a violation of Title IX, a federal  civil rights law.

A message from Schwertner's LinkedIn account sent to the graduate student said: "Hope you're getting my texts I sent to you." The student responded: "Please stop the inappropriate texts, it is unprofessional." The student also received  text messages from an Austin area number that matched a business card belonging to Schwertner. These messages included: "Sorry. I really just wanted to fuck you," "This is Charles," "Send a pic?" and "Hello? Want to just use LinkedIn? Or my main cell?". Schwertner also sent a photograph that was identified as his penis.

Schwertner's lawyers told investigators that the senator had shared the username and password for his LinkedIn account with a third party, whom Schwertner knows but would not identify. The summary says that an attorney for that party “did not disclose the third person’s relationship" with Schwertner and did not reveal why the messages were sent. That attorney also would not disclose the third party's identity, but claimed the individual sent the messages without Schwertner’s prior knowledge and “signed an affidavit attesting to the truth of his or her statements.”

The University of Texas ultimately concluded its investigation of Schwertner, stating that the “available evidence does not support a finding" that he had violated university policy or Title IX.

The two-page executive summary says that Schwertner "refused to meet with" the investigating attorney and that "[Schwertner] has access to information that could allow a more definitive conclusion to this matter, but [Schwertner] is unwilling to share that information, and the University lacks authority to compel him to cooperate more fully.”

Ross Ramey of the Texas Tribune wrote: "The problem is that the investigation at UT didn’t reach any final conclusions. The investigator couldn’t prove Schwertner was at fault, but also couldn’t prove he was not. There is no evidence here to clear his name. In that way, it’s as though no investigation had taken place; Schwertner is in the same fix he was in after the allegations were known and before Johnny Sutton, a former U.S. attorney who is now in private practice, started digging around."

Following the controversy, Schwertner's wife filed for divorce on January 30, 2019.

DWI Allegations
On February 7, 2023 Schwertner was arrested and charged with driving while intoxicated in Austin, Texas, according to Travis County, Texas records.

Election history

2018

2014

2012

2010

References

1970 births
Living people
Republican Party Texas state senators
Republican Party members of the Texas House of Representatives
People from Georgetown, Texas
American surgeons
21st-century American politicians
Politicians from Tuscaloosa, Alabama